Ahmad Khuzaimi bin Piee (born 11 November 1993), nicknamed Jimmy, is a Malaysian professional footballer who plays as a defender for Malaysian Super League side Selangor and the Malaysia national team.

Early life 
Khuzaimi was born in Krubong, Melaka, Malaysia.

Club career

Youth 
Khuzaimi started his football career with the Melaka United (formerly Malacca FA) U-21 in Piala Presiden competition and subsequently transferred to MP Muar.

Melaka United 
Khuzaimi then moved on to Melaka's senior team in the third-tier FAM Cup for two years in 2013 and 2014.

PKNS 
In 2015, he signed a three-year contract with PKNS. In November 2014 he joined PKNS, making 3 league appearances. He only appeared in two games for PKNS before being loaned out to SAMB in early 2016.

SAMB (loan) 
During his time with PKNS he also spent time on loan at SAMB, making 7 league appearances and scoring 3 goals.

Return to Melaka United 
In June 2016 he rejoined Melaka, which saw him playing in the defense with Khair Jones and Shin Jae-pil that led to the Malaysia Premier League championship. He also managed to make 24 league appearances and scored 2 goals.

PKNP (loan) 
He was loaned out by Melaka United to PKNP in early 2018 and returned to Melaka at the end of the season. He made 7 league appearances.

UiTM 
He stated that his performance had been declining with Melaka United in 2019, so he decided to transfer to UiTM in 2020 to regain his form.

Negeri Sembilan 
After UiTM has been relegated to the second-tier Premier League, he joined Negeri Sembilan in 2022 to continue playing in the Super League.

Selangor 
On 20 December 2022, Khuzaimi joined Selangor on a free transfer, following the expiry of his Negeri Sembilan contract.

International career 
In September 2016, Khuzaimi received his first national team call-up for the international friendlies against Singapore and Afghanistan although he is still playing in the second division, Malaysia Premier League. However, he is only playing in one match where he made his debut for Malaysia against Afghanistan on 11 October 2016, coming on as a substitute for Nazirul Naim in the 68th minute. 

He did not play for the national team again for the next six years after his debut. Khuzaimi cites his injuries badly affects his performance and it might be the reason for not getting called up for a long time.

In March 2022, he was called up again among 25-man squad against the Philippines, Singapore, and Albirex Niigata Singapore.

Honours

Club
Melaka United
 Malaysia Premier League: 2016

References

External links
Melaka United S.A. Team
Football Association of Malaysia Official Website

1993 births
Living people
Malaysian footballers
Malaysia international footballers
Negeri Sembilan FC players
Selangor FA players
Association football fullbacks
Association football central defenders
People from Malacca
Malaysian people of Malay descent